This is a partial list of cultivars in the genus Hibiscus.
 Hibiscus 'Acadian Spring'
 Hibiscus 'Acapulco Gold'
 Hibiscus 'Accolade'
 Hibiscus 'Adrenalin'
 Hibiscus 'African Princess'
 Hibiscus 'Agnes Hopkins'

 Hibiscus 'Albo Lacinatus'
 Hibiscus 'Alexandra Maree'
 Hibiscus 'Alii Uii'
 Hibiscus 'Allan McMullen'
 Hibiscus 'Alluvial Gold'
 Hibiscus 'All Aglow'
 Hibiscus 'Aloha'
 Hibiscus 'Aloha-Elegans'
 Hibiscus 'Alyrah Carol'
 Hibiscus 'Amanda Dubin'
 Hibiscus 'Amanda Nicole'
 Hibiscus 'Amasport'
 Hibiscus 'Amayzing'
 Hibiscus 'Amber Doll'
 Hibiscus 'Amber Magna'
 Hibiscus 'Amber Splashes'
 Hibiscus 'Amber Suzanne'
 Hibiscus 'American Maid'
 Hibiscus 'Amethyst Crystal'
 Hibiscus 'Amethyst Heart'
 Hibiscus 'Amy Lynn'
 Hibiscus 'Anasazi Maiden'
 Hibiscus 'Anastasia'
 Hibiscus 'Andante'

 Hibiscus 'Andersonii'
 Hibiscus 'Andee'
 Hibiscus 'Angel's Wings'
 Hibiscus 'Anna Elizabeth'
 Hibiscus 'Anna Nicole'
 Hibiscus 'Antique Rose'
 Hibiscus 'Antique Treasure'
 Hibiscus 'Apple Blossom'
 Hibiscus 'Aztec Sun'
 Hibiscus 'Banana Orange-Sherbert'
 Hibiscus 'Beautifil Desire'
 Hibiscus 'Bebop'
 Hibiscus 'Belle du Jour'
 Hibiscus 'Bessie'
 Hibiscus 'Black Baron'
 Hibiscus 'Black Beauty'
 Hibiscus 'Black Dragon'
 Hibiscus 'Black Dream'
 Hibiscus 'Black Night'
 Hibiscus 'Blueblood'
 Hibiscus 'Blue Ballerina'
 Hibiscus 'Blue Bayou'
 Hibiscus 'Blues In The Night'
 Hibiscus 'Bold & Beautiful'
 Hibiscus 'Bon Vivant'
 Hibiscus 'Briar Patch'
 Hibiscus 'Bright Horizon'
 Hibiscus 'Brilliant'
 Hibiscus 'Burnished Gold'
 Hibiscus 'Butterfly'
 Hibiscus 'Candy'
 Hibiscus 'Cashmere Wind'
 Hibiscus 'Chad'
 Hibiscus 'Chariots of Fire'
 Hibiscus 'Charles Schmidt'
 Hibiscus 'Charlie's Angels'
 Hibiscus 'Chere'
 Hibiscus 'Chinese Lantern'
 Hibiscus 'Coloring Book'
 Hibiscus 'Confection Perfection'

 Hibiscus 'Cooperi'
 Hibiscus 'Cosmic Gold'
 Hibiscus 'Creole Belle'
 Hibiscus 'Creole Lady'
 Hibiscus 'Crimson Kiss'
 Hibiscus 'Crimson Rays'
 Hibiscus 'Crystal Pink'
 Hibiscus 'Cuban Variety'
 Hibiscus 'Daddy's Girl'

 Hibiscus 'Dainty Pink'

 Hibiscus 'Dainty White'
 Hibiscus 'Dark Charm'
 Hibiscus 'Desert Sun'
 Hibiscus 'Donna Lyn'

 Hibiscus 'Double Psyche'
 Hibiscus 'Dragon's Breath'
 Hibiscus 'Elderberry'

 Hibiscus 'El Capitolio'
 Hibiscus 'El Capitolio Triple'
 Hibiscus 'Electric Orange'
 Hibiscus 'Erin Rachael'
 Hibiscus 'Elephant Ear'
 Hibiscus 'Estelle K'
 Hibiscus 'Exploding Love'
 Hibiscus 'Fat Actress'
 Hibiscus 'Feelin' Blue'
 Hibiscus 'Fiji Island'
 Hibiscus 'First Love'
 Hibiscus 'Fifth Dimension'
 Hibiscus 'Fort Myers'
 Hibiscus 'Fourth Of July'
 Hibiscus 'Gabriel'
 Hibiscus 'Gator Magic'
 Hibiscus 'General Cortes'
 Hibiscus 'Georgia Thunder'
 Hibiscus 'Going Green'
 Hibiscus 'Gold Rain'
 Hibiscus 'Great White'
 Hibiscus 'Halley's Comet'
 Hibiscus 'Harvest Moon'
 Hibiscus 'Hawaiian Salmon'
 Hibiscus 'Headmaster'
 Hibiscus 'Heaven Scent'
 Hibiscus 'Her Majesty'
 Hibiscus 'Herm Geller'
 Hibiscus 'Hilo Island'
 Hibiscus 'High Voltage'
 Hibiscus 'Honey Do'
 Hibiscus 'Hot Pepper'
 Hibiscus 'Hot Red Cooperii'
 Hibiscus 'Hula Girl'
 Hibiscus 'Ice Fairy'
 Hibiscus 'Isobel Beard'
 Hibiscus 'It's a Wonderful Life'
 Hibiscus 'Janys'
 Hibiscus 'Kinchen's Yellow'
 Hibiscus 'Kopper King'
 Hibiscus 'Lady Adele'
 Hibiscus 'Lady In Waiting'
 Hibiscus 'Lilac Wine'
 Hibiscus 'Little Girl'
 Hibiscus 'Living Legend'
 Hibiscus 'Luoise Bennet'
 Hibiscus 'Love Story'

 Hibiscus 'Madeline Champion'
 Hibiscus 'Magic Moments'

 Hibiscus 'Mango Dainty'
 Hibiscus 'Maroon Stars'
 Hibiscus 'Maui Masterpiece'
 Hibiscus 'Mikey'
 Hibiscus 'Midnight Blue'
 Hibiscus 'Mini Skirt'
 Hibiscus 'Miss Liberty'
 Hibiscus 'Moon Jelly Fish'
 Hibiscus 'Morning Star'
 Hibiscus 'Mr. Ace'
 Hibiscus 'My Maria'
 Hibiscus 'Mystic Medallion'
 Hibiscus 'Nanette Peach'
 Hibiscus 'Night Fever'
 Hibiscus 'Night Fire'
 Hibiscus 'Norman Lee'

 Hibiscus 'Orange El Capitolio'
 Hibiscus 'Palm Springs'
 Hibiscus 'Painted lady'
 Hibiscus 'Panorama'
 Hibiscus 'Pineapple Sundae'

 Hibiscus 'President'
 Hibiscus 'Prima Ballerina'

 Hibiscus 'Psyche'
 Hibiscus 'Raging Bull'
 Hibiscus 'Rain Drop'
 Hibiscus 'Red Hot'
 Hibiscus 'Red Snapper'
 Hibiscus 'Red Wave'
 Hibiscus 'Rise and Shine'
 Hibiscus 'Robin Hood'
 Hibiscus 'Rocket's Red Glare'
 Hibiscus 'Rockin' Robin'
 Hibiscus 'Romeo'
 Hibiscus 'Roseflake'
 Hibiscus 'Rose Of China'
 Hibiscus 'Ros Etsy'
 Hibiscus 'Saffron'
 Hibiscus 'Schizopetalus'
 Hibiscus 'Silver Memories'
 Hibiscus 'Seminole pink'
 Hibiscus 'Simple Pleasures'
 Hibiscus 'Sleeping Beauty'
 Hibiscus 'Snowflake'
 Hibiscus 'Snow Queen'
 Hibiscus 'Song Sung Blue'
 Hibiscus 'Sparkling Water'
 Hibiscus 'Sprinkle Rain'
 Hibiscus 'Sunshower'
 Hibiscus 'Super Star'
 Hibiscus 'Sweet Violet'

 Hibiscus 'Sylvia Goodman'
 Hibiscus 'Tammy'
 Hibiscus 'The Path'
 Hibiscus 'Tigerama'
 Hibiscus 'Topaz Glory'
 Hibiscus 'Tylene'
 Hibiscus 'Vanilla Sundae'
 Hibiscus 'Vin Beaujolias'
 Hibiscus 'Wall Flower'
 Hibiscus 'West Coast Red'
 Hibiscus 'White Wings'
 Hibiscus 'White Swan'
 Hibiscus 'Wild Child'
 Hibiscus 'Winter Lights'

Hibiscus
Lists of cultivars